It Takes All Kinds is a 1969 crime drama film directed by Eddie Davis.

Plot
American sailor Tony Gunher is asked by Laura Ring to help steal a glass-stained window from a museum. The robbery is a success but then Laura disappears with the window. Tony finds her and she's discovered with crime lord Orville Benton. Benton has a collection of art treasures in the false bottom of a wheat silo. Police capture Benton and his gang but Laura dies.

Cast
 Vera Miles as Laura Ring
 Robert Lansing as Tony Gunther
 Barry Sullivan as Orville Benton
 Sid Melton as Benji
 Penny Sugg as J.P. Duncan
 Chris Christensen as Swede
 Edward Heppie as Cockney
 Tommy Dysart as seaman
 Alistair Smart as Ray
 Rod Mullinar as policeman
 Bob Haddow as Dan
 Peter Whittle as bodyguard
 Roger Ward as bodyguard
 John Llewellyn as detective
 Les Berryman

Production
The film was the first of three movies made by Reg Goldsworthy in association with Commonwealth United Corporation for the American television market. The director and leading actors were imported from Hollywood but the rest of the cast and crew were Australian.

It was shot in four weeks in March 1968. Locations were shot around Sydney and Melbourne with interiors done at Ajax Studios in Sydney.

Release
The film was poorly reviewed and had a disappointing commercial reception.

References

External links
 
 
 It Takes All Kinds at Oz Movies

1969 films
1969 crime drama films
1960s heist films
Australian crime drama films
Films directed by Eddie Davis
Australian heist films
1960s English-language films